The 2007–08 Algerian Cup was the 44th edition of the Algerian Cup. JSM Béjaïa won the Cup by defeating WA Tlemcen 3-1 on penalties in the final, after the game ended 1-1. It was the first time that JSM Béjaïa won the trophy.

Quarter-finals

Semi-finals

Final
Kickoff times are in local time.

Champions

External links
 Coupe d'Algérie 2008
 Algeria 2007/08 Coupe Nationale

Algerian Cup
Algerian Cup
Algerian Cup